Hob wa Dumoo`  is a 1955 Egyptian romance drama film directed by Kamal El Sheikh. It stars Ahmed Ramzy, Zaki Rostom, and Faten Hamama.

The film was a blockbuster in the Soviet Union, where it sold  tickets at the box office in 1957.

Plot 

Faten Hamama plays Fatimah, a woman who is forced to leave her fiance for an old man to whom her father is in debt. Her father kills the man but is also killed himself. She is forced to work in a cabaret but returns to her love, Ahmed.

Main cast 
Faten Hamama as Fatimah
Ahmed Ramzy as Ahmed
Zaki Rostom
Aqila Ratib

References

External links 
 

1955 films
1950s Arabic-language films
Films directed by Kamal El Sheikh
1955 romantic drama films
Egyptian romantic drama films
Egyptian black-and-white films